The 2000 Turkmenistan earthquake took place at 8:11 p.m. Moscow Time on December 6 and had a magnitude of 7.0. The intensity of the earthquake reached VII at its epicenter, and IV at the Turkmen capital of Ashgabat. The epicentre was located approximately 25 kilometers north of the city of Balkanabat and 125 kilometres southeast of Türkmenbaşy. There were unconfirmed reports that the quake killed up to 11 people and injured 5 others.

Tectonic setting
Turkmenistan lies at the northern edge of the zone of complex tectonics caused by the continuing collision between the Arabian Plate and the Eurasian Plate. The main structure in the Caspian Sea is the Apsheron Sill, a zone of active subduction. The trend of the Apsheron sill is quite oblique to the overall plate motion and this results in significant amounts of right lateral strike-slip along this structure in an overall transpressional setting. Onshore, the motion along the Apsheron sill is transferred to the Ashgabat Fault, another right lateral strike-slip fault, across a large restraining bend.

Earthquake
The focal mechanism for this event indicates that it was the result of oblique reverse faulting on one of two possible faults, either northwest–southeast or west–east trending.

See also
 List of earthquakes in 2000

References

External links
Strong Earthquake Hits Turkmenistan – People's Daily

Earthquakes in Turkmenistan
Turkmenistan earthquake
Earthquake 
Earthquake